Mercury Meltdown is a puzzle-platform game for the PlayStation Portable (PSP). It is the sequel to Archer Maclean's Mercury. Like the first game, the goal is to tilt the stage in order to navigate one or more blobs of mercury to the destination. In contrast to the original, Ignition Banbury had more time and experience developing the game and listened to player feedback, allowing the game to be easier and provide players with more freedom to choose levels. The game has new hazards, enemies, and minigames.

The game received a port to the PlayStation 2 (PS2) titled Mercury Meltdown Remix released a month after the original, with improved graphics, new levels and optimized for the PS2's controller. A second port for the Wii titled Mercury Meltdown Revolution was released in 2007 and also changing the levels, improving the graphics further from the Remix version and making use of Wii's motion controls.

All versions of Mercury Meltdown were well-received by critics. The game was praised for being an overall improvement from the original in terms of difficulty and art style. Mercury Meltdown Remix received mixed reviews in regards to the PS2 controls with some criticism of removing multiplayer. Mercury Meltdown Revolution also criticized for lack of multiplayer but was praised for its motion controls.

Gameplay

Similar to its predecessor, Mercury Meltdown is a puzzle-platform game. The goal is to navigate one or more blobs of mercury to one or more finish posts in the level by tilting the stage using the analog stick of the PSP. Players automatically lose the stage if all of the mercury is from the stage is lost, or no longer meeting the requirements to complete the level. The mercury can be split into multiple blobs by using sharp objects or obstacles. The color of the mercury can be changed using a Paintshop or merging with other blobs of different colors. Color mixing is based on the RGB color model. The game is made up of worlds referred to as "Laboratories" that are split into 16 stages represented as test-tubes. Stages have achievements for completing with 100% remaining mercury, obtaining the top score, and obtaining all bonus stars. An additional achievement is granted for obtaining all three in a single stage and can all be obtained individually via multiple playthroughs. Laboratories are unlocked after accumulating enough mercury after each stage completion. If players do exceptionally well in one particular laboratory, a secret 17th stage in that laboratory is unlocked.

Mercury Meltdown introduces the Playground; a circular arena, with most of the items found in stages to play and test with. Another new mechanic is the ability to change the mercury into 3 new states: Cold, Hot, and Solid. The Hot state makes the mercury an easily splittable liquid that travels quickly. The Cold state makes the mercury a semi-solid blob that moves slowly and is harder to split. The Solid state turns the mercury into a solid ball that can't be split, allowing it to traverse over rails. Multiplayer is accessible between two PSPs via Ad-Hoc wireless mode or online network infrastructure mode. In multiplayer mode, players can participate in battle mode in which players can race each other from previously unlocked single player levels. Bonus stars are replaced with battle pick-ups that can assist players or hinder their opponent.

In addition to the main game, Mercury Meltdown introduces five unlockable party games: Rodeo, Race, Metrix, Shove, and Paint. In Rodeo, players tilt the stage to prevent the mercury from falling off. In Race, players race mercury around a track. Metrix is a match 3 puzzle minigame requiring one to make a group of three or more colored blobs that fits inside a pre-defined grid. In Shove, players aim the mercury for the center spot of a target, avoiding hazards; similar to curling. In Paint, players move the mercury to paint the tray in their respected colors before the opponent does. These can be unlocked by collecting the bonus stars in the main game. All the party games can be played in single-player and multiplayer.

Development and release
Mercury Meltdown was developed by Ignition Banbury (formerly Awesome Studios). Early in production stages Archer Maclean who originally coined the concept of the first game, had resigned from Ignition Banbury. His resignation was early enough in development to not have hindered the game's production. The first game, Mercury, was released in a tight production schedule to match the launch of the PlayStation Portable, resulting in a lack of refinements. Mercury Meltdown was closer to what the development team originally wanted in the first game due to them becoming more experienced with PSP development. Ignition Banbury chose to use a cel-shaded style with the purpose of differentiating it from its predecessor and to appeal to a wider audience. One of the criticism of the original game that the developers made note of was the difficulty. Ignition Banbury focused on making it easier and less linear. It was intended to be released in Europe by September 2006 with plans of having downloadable content (DLC), however the game was delayed and no DLC was released. Mercury Meltdown was released in North America on October 3, 2006 and in Europe on October 6, 2006. A limited edition bundle was released with its predecessor, Archer Maclean's Mercury on October 19, 2010. An iOS version was announced in E3 2011, however no new information had since been released.

A month prior to the release of the PSP version, Ignition Banbury announced a revised version for the PlayStation 2 titled Mercury Meltdown Remix. This version makes use of the DualShock controller's second analog stick and rumble feature as opposed to the PSP's singular analog. It added new levels, making the total over 200 levels, and improved the graphics. Mercury Meltdown Remix was released in Europe on November 24, 2006, and in North America on December 4, 2006.

The PS2 version was revised once more and ported onto the Wii under the title, Mercury Meltdown Revolution. Ignition Banbury began development when Nintendo announced the Wii under the code name: Revolution and were inspired by the Wii's motion controls. Ignition Banbury then pitched the concept to Nintendo in E3 2006, which resulted in it being approved by Nintendo. Ignition Banbury produced the game using an unfinished Gamecube engine and the tilt sensor mechanics that were intended to be used for the original Mercury game.  Ignition Banbury further improved graphics from Mercury Meltdown Remix, added in new levels, and refined the difficulty curve.  In addition to utilizing the Wii Remote's tilt control, Ignition Banbury also implemented the option to play Revolution with a Classic Controller and also attempted to add GameCube controller support, but this feature did not make the final release.  Mercury Meltdown Revolution was released in Europe on June 8, 2007, and in North America on October 17, 2007.

Reception

All versions of Mercury Meltdown have been well received by critics. The PSP, PS2, and Wii versions hold an aggregated score of 78, 73, and 77 out of 100 respectively. Both the PSP and Wii version were featured in 1001 Video Games You Must Play Before You Die. In regards to the original PSP version, critics gave praise on the improvements it made from the difficult and new visual style. Eurogamer praised the difficulty curves being more consistent and the variety of the level designs IGN complimented the new cel-shaded design and bright colors as opposed from the cold-steel design of its predecessor, stating that it brightens the game and makes it more fun. IGN further elaborated that the new cel-shaded design of the mercury blob making it easier to define the shape of the blob and when it dissipates. GameSpot also praised the stages being more pleasing to the eye due to the bright and colorful. PALGN noted that the environments didn't feel as epic, however, did feel more lively. Pocket Gamer stated it was an improvement from its predecessor in nearly every way.

Mercury Meltdown Remix received mixed reviews from critics. Both GameZone and PALGN complimented the camera controls for improving the game. GameSpot criticized the new controls for controlling the camera, stating the sensitivity was too high and allowing more mistakes to be made. Another criticism was the lack of multiplayer option, causing the Party games to become dull without it. IGN was also critical of it, feeling that the PlayStation 2 controller did not feel right.

Mercury Meltdown Revolution received more positive reception, in particular for the motion controls. PALGN complimented how well the motion controls work. Eurogamer felt that the controls were more well-realized than other Wii games at the time and were accessible to all players. IGN UK gave it an editor's choice award, although they said that the sound could be better and a lack of multiplayer is disappointing, especially on the Wii. GamePro stated the motion controls were fresh and a lot of fun, however also criticized the lack of multiplayer option. Play was very critical of the Wii version due to similar titles in the Wii's library and the art style not being as appealing as other titles such as Kororinpa.

References

2006 video games
Atari games
Marble games
PlayStation Portable games
PlayStation 2 games
Puzzle-platform games
Sony Interactive Entertainment games
Video games developed in the United Kingdom
Wii games
Multiplayer and single-player video games
UTV Ignition Games games